In the fourteen years the Weimar Republic was in existence, some forty parties were represented in the Reichstag. This fragmentation of political power was in part due to the use of a peculiar proportional representation electoral system that encouraged regional or small special interest parties and in part due to the many challenges facing the nascent German democracy in this period.

After the Nazi seizure of power, they used the provisions of the Reichstag Fire Decree to effectively eliminate their chief adversaries, first the Communists (March 1933) and then the Social Democrats (22 June 1933) through arrests, confiscation of assets and removal from office. Other parties were pressured into disbanding on their own or were swept away by the "Law Against the Formation of Parties" (14 July 1933) which declared the Nazi Party to be Germany's only legal political party.

Weimar political parties

Left-wing

Alte Sozialdemokratische Partei Deutschlands (ASPD) — Old Social Democratic Party of Germany. A regional party based in Saxony that split from the SPD in 1926. It never gained a mass following and disbanded in 1932.
Kommunistische Arbeiter-Partei Deutschlands (KAPD) — Communist Workers' Party of Germany. An ultra-leftist party that split from the KPD in April 1920. They rejected participation in the Reichstag and called for immediate revolutionary action. Immediately after its formation the party endured a series of splinters and lost much of the little influence it had. (Against the government)
Kommunistische Partei Deutschlands (KPD) — Communist Party of Germany. Formed at the very end of 1918 out of a number of left-wing groups, including the left-wing of the USPD and the Spartacus League. It was a Marxist-Leninist party that advocated revolution by the proletariat and the creation of a communist regime according to the example of the Soviet Union. It was the main far-left party for the majority of the Weimar period. The party's major paper was the Die Rote Fahne (The Red Flag). (Against the government)
Kommunistische Partei Deutschlands (Opposition) (KPO) — Communist Party of Germany (Opposition). Split from the KPD in 1928, representing the "Right Opposition" of the Bukharinists against the Stalinist "Center" and the Trotskyist "Left Opposition". It never intended to be a real political party, but to influence the KPD.
Sozialdemokratische Partei Deutschlands (SPD) — Social Democratic Party of Germany (between 1917 and 1922 also called Mehrheitssozialdemokratische Partei (MSPD) – Majority Social Democrats). Founded in 1875, it was one of the earliest Marxist-influenced parties in the world. A member of the Weimar Coalition, the SPD supported the parliamentary system of democracy and extensive social programs in the economy. For most of the Weimar Republic's existence until 1932, the SPD was the largest single party in the Reichstag and it participated in several coalition governments. Its party newspaper was the Vorwärts. (Pro-Weimar Republic)
Sozialistische Arbeiterpartei Deutschlands (SAPD) — Socialist Workers' Party of Germany. A left-wing faction that split from the SPD in 1931. Parts of the USPD and dissenters from the KPD and the KPO joined it, but it remained small. Its political positions were near to those of the USPD, wavering between the SPD and the KPD.
Sozialistischer Bund — Socialist League. A splinter party that formed from the USPD in 1922 and merged into the SADP in 1931.
Unabhängige Sozialdemokratische Partei Deutschlands (USPD) — Independent Social Democratic Party of Germany. This was formed by an anti-war faction that split from the SPD in 1917. It was a Marxist party that sought change through parliament and social progressive programs. The left-wing majority of the party joined the Communist Party in December 1920, while the remainder reunited with the MSPD in September 1922. A splinter element (Sozialistischer Bund) continued as an independent party, never attaining any real electoral success and finally merging with the SAPD in 1931. (Against the government)
Vereinigte Kommunistische Partei Deutschlands (VKPD) — United Communist Party of Germany. Name taken by the KPD when it merged with the majority of the USPD in December 1920. It reverted to its former name in 1922. (Against the government)

Centre
Deutsche Bauernpartei (DBP) — German Farmers' Party. An agrarian party founded in 1928 to advocate for the economic interests of small farmers and peasants.
Deutsche Demokratische Partei (DDP) — German Democratic Party. Formed in 1918 as the successor to the Progressive People's Party, the DDP was a center-left party that supported social liberalism. A member of the Weimar Coalition, it was one of the main liberal parties and participated in several coalition governments. (Pro-Weimar Republic)
Deutscher Staatspartei (DStP) — German State Party. Formed in 1930 by a merger of the DDP and the Volksnationale Reichsvereinigung (VNRV) (People's National Reich Association), the political wing of the Young German Order. The VNRV Reichstag delegates soon seceded from the party, leaving it essentially the DDP under a new name. (Pro-Weimar Republic)
Deutsche Volkspartei (DVP) — German People's Party. Formed in 1918 from the pre-Weimar National Liberals, it was a center-right party supporting right-liberalism. Its platform stressed Christian family values, secular education, lower tariffs, opposition to welfare spending and agrarian subsidies, and hostility to socialism. Gustav Stresemann was its chairman and it participated in all governments until 1931. After Stresseann's death, the party turned further to the right. 
Hanseatischer Volksbund (HVB) — Hanseatic People's League. A regional party founded in Lübeck in 1926, supported by the middle classes opposed to Marxism and social democracy. It was allied with the DVP.
Schleswig-Holsteinische Bauern- und Landarbeiterdemokratie (SHBLD) — Schleswig-Holstein Farmers and Farmworkers Democracy. A regional agrarian party active in Schleswig-Holstein between 1919 and 1924. It was a moderate party that leaned towards liberalism, and co-operated with the DVP.
Volksnationale Reichsvereinigung — People's National Reich Association. This was the political wing of the Young German Order and it briefly merged with the DDP in 1930 to form the DStP. (Pro-Weimar Republic)
Zentrumspartei — Centre Party. It was the continuation of the pre-Weimar Catholic party of the same name. A member of the Weimar Coalition, the Centre Party was the third-largest party in the Reichstag for most of the Weimar Republic and participated in all governments until 1932. Their party newspaper was Germania. (Pro-Weimar Republic)

Right-wing
Bayerische Volkspartei (BVP) — Bavarian People's Party. A Catholic and conservative party, in 1918 it split off from the Centre Party to pursue a more conservative and particularist Bavarian course. (Pro-Weimar Republic)
 (BNP) — Brunswick Lower–Saxon Party. This was a small regional party active in the Free State of Brunswick. It was conservative, monarchist and anti-republican. It formed an electoral alliance with the DVP and the DNVP.
Christlich-Nationale Bauern- und Landvolkpartei (CNBL) — Christian National Peasants' and Farmers' Party. This was a conservative agrarian party that broke off from the German National People's Party (DNVP) in 1928. It contested the 1930 and 1932 Reichstag elections under the name Deutsches Landvolk (German Rural Folk).
Christlich-Sozialer Volksdienst (CSVD) — Christian Social People's Service. A conservative Protestant party formed at the end of 1929, it was mainly supported by the middle class and Christian trade unionists. It supported state welfare, trade unions and workers participation in management; it opposed atheism, liberalism and Marxism.
Christliche Volkspartei (CVP) — Christian People's Party. A short-lived Catholic party based in the Rhineland. (Pro-Weimar Republic)
Deutsch-Hannoversche Partei (DHP) — German-Hanoverian Party, also known as the Guelph Party. A regional conservative party in Prussia's Province of Hanover that unsuccessfully advocated for a Free State of Hanover. 
 Deutsche Arbeiterpartei (DAP) — German Workers' Party. This was formed in 1919 by Anton Drexler, with Gottfried Feder, Dietrich Eckart and Karl Harrer, and derived in part from the Thule Society, the cover organization of the occult ariosophist Germanenorden.  This party added the adjective "National Socialist" in its name and became the "National Socialist German Workers' Party" (NSDAP) in 1920. (Against the government)
Deutsche Reformpartei — German Reform Party (splinter party).
Deutschnationale Volkspartei (DNVP) — German National People's Party. It presented itself as a volksgemeinschaft or non-class party.  It included remnants from the German Conservative Party, the Free Conservative Party, the Völkische movement, the Christian Social movement, and the Pan-German Association.  It established two labor unions; one for the blue-collar worker (the DNAB) and one for the white-collar worker (DNAgB), which had been politically unimportant.  The DNVP was the main authoritarian right party of Weimar Germany but moved to the radical right after coming under the control of press baron Alfred Hugenberg in 1928. It organized the National Opposition in 1929, together with leaders of Der Stahlhelm, Hjalmar Schacht, the president of the Reichsbank, and the Nazi Party, to oppose Chancellor Hermann Müller's Grand Coalition. It joined in coalition with Hitler's government in January 1933. (Against the government)
Deutschsoziale Partei (DSP)  — German Social Party. A far-right antisemitic and Völkisch political party, active from 1921 to 1929. (Against the government)
Deutschsozialistische Partei (DSP) — German-Socialist Party. A far-right, nationalist party heavily influenced by the antisemitic Thule Society. It was headed by Julius Streicher, and it was also highly organized, despite having a rather small size. In a controversial move, it dissolved itself in 1922 and many of its members entered the (then very new) Nazi Party. (Against the government)
Deutschvölkische Freiheitspartei (DVFP) — German Völkisch Freedom Party. The party of General Ludendorff.  It campaigned for an authoritarian regime that would be very nationalistic and promoted socioeconomic questions.  It also sought to close the stock exchanges and nationalize the banks.  In May 1924, it obtained 6.4% of the vote in alliance with NSDAP, but fell to 3% in the next election, in December 1924. (Against the government)
Deutschvölkische Reichspartei (DVRP) (Against the government)
Großdeutsche Arbeiterpartei (GDAP) (Against the government)
Großdeutsche Volksgemeinschaft (GVG) — Greater German People's Community. A Nazi front organization established in January 1924 when the Nazi Party was outlawed. Centered in Bavaria, it was led by Alfred Rosenberg until July when he was ousted by Julius Streicher. Opposed to electoral politics, it was not represented in the Reichstag. It dissolved in March 1925 and was reabsorbed by the Nazi Party. (Against the government)
Konservative Volkspartei (KVP) — Conservative People's Party. It split off from the DNVP in 1930, following that party's turn  to the far-right under Alfred Hugenberg. (Pro-Weimar Republic)
Nationalsozialistische Deutsche Arbeiterpartei (NSDAP) — National Socialist German Workers' Party (Nazi Party). This was a far-right political party in Germany that was active between 1920 and 1945, and that created and supported the ideology of Nazism. Its precursor, the German Workers' Party (Deutsche Arbeiterpartei; DAP), existed from 1919 to 1920. The Nazi Party emerged from the German nationalist, racist and populist Freikorps paramilitary culture, which fought against the communist uprisings in post-World War I Germany. It supported the ideas of Führerprinzip, Volksgemeinschaft, Pan-Germanism, Lebensraum and the "Aryan Master Race". The party incorporated fervent antisemitism, anti-communism, anti-capitalism, scientific racism, and the use of eugenics into its creed. Headed by Adolf Hitler from 1921, the party became the largest in the Reichstag by July 1932. Its main newspaper was the Völkischer Beobachter.
Nationalsozialistische Freiheitspartei (NSFP) — National Socialist Freedom Party. A Nazi front organization established in April 1924 when the Nazi Party was outlawed and Hitler was jailed. The remaining Nazis formed it as a legal means of carrying on the party and its ideology. As the National Socialist Freedom movement (NSFB), it ran as a combined list with the DVFP in the 1924 Reichstag elections and disbanded shortly after the Nazi Party was re-established in February 1925. (Against the government)
Reichspartei des deutschen Mittelstandes — Reich Party of the German Middle Class. It was formed in 1920 and was known until 1925 as Wirtschaftspartei des deutschen Mittelstandes, or the Economic Party of the German Middle Classes. It commonly was referred to as the Wirtschaftspartei (WP). It was a conservative party, supporting a reduction in government economic involvement, a freer hand for business and lower taxes. It was particularly opposed to revaluation, which it considered an attack on the rights of property owners.
Reichspartei für Volksrecht und Aufwertung — Reich Party for Civil Rights and Deflation, also known as the  Volksrechtpartei (VRP) or People's Justice Party. Formed in 1926, the party was conservative in outlook and represented itself as the defender of savers, calling for the creation of as broad a middle class as possible. It sought to represent those worst hit by the hyperinflation of the early 1920s.
Wirtschaftspartei — (see Reichspartei des deutschen Mittelstandes.)

Other political organizations
Allgemeiner Deutscher Beamtenbund (ADB) — A civil servants' league started by the SPD.
Bund der Landwirte (BdL) — the Agrarian League was an agricultural advocacy group that opposed free trade, industrialization, and liberalism. It merged with the Deutscher Landbund in 1921 to form the Reichslandbund.
Bauernverein — Peasant association located in Schleswig-Holstein. Without religious ties, it initially supported a liberal economic and political policy.
Bauernvereine — Farmers' associations associated with the Center Party, that were located in the Catholic west and south.
Bayerischer Bauernbund (BB) — Bavarian Peasants' League. Operated throughout Germany but especially in its stronghold of Bavaria. It had democratic, anticlerical leanings and subscribed to a narrow Bavarian particularism. It supported the BVP and the DNVP, and in 1928 helped found the DBP
Braunschweigischer Landeswahlverband (BLWV) — Brunswick State Electoral Association. This was a regional electoral alliance of conservative bourgeois parties, consisting of the Deutsche Volkspartei (DVP), the Deutschnationale Volkspartei (DNVP) and the Welf–oriented Braunschweigisch-Niedersächsische Partei (BNP), or Brunswick Lower–Saxon Party. It was active between 1918 and 1922 in the Free State of Brunswick. (Against the government)
Christlich-föderalistische Reichswahlliste — Combined list of the Bavarian People's Party (BVP) and the Christliche Volkspartei (CVP). (Pro-Weimar Republic)
Christliche Volkspartei (CVP) — Combined list of the Bavarian People's Party (BVP) and the Center Party. (Pro-Weimar Republic)
Der Stahlhelm, Bund der Frontsoldaten — The Steel Helmet, League of Front-Line Soldiers. Founded in December 1918 by Franz Seldte, this was the First World War veteran's organisation. Officially above party politics, it was conservative, nationalistic and monarchist. After 1929, it took on an anti-republican and anti-democratic character. Its goals were the overthrow of the Republic in favor of a dictatorship and a revanchist program. In 1931, it joined the DNVP and the NSDAP to form the Harzburg Front. (Against the government)
Deutsche Landwirtschafsrat (German Agricultural Council)
Deutschvölkischer Schutz- und Trutzbund — German Nationalist Protection and Defiance Federation. This was the largest and the most active anti-Semitic federation in Germany. Founded in 1919, it was anti-democratic and advocated violence. After the murder of Foreign Minister Walther Rathenau in 1922, it was banned in most states of the Reich and disbanded by 1924. (Against the government)
Federation of German Retail Business
Green Front — An umbrella group which consisted of the Reichslandbund (RLB), the Deutsche Bauernshaft (formerly Bauernbund), the Association of Christian-German Peasant Unions, and the German Agricultural Council. It too heavily promoted the Junkers interest and drove out many farmers.
Harzburger Front — Harzburg Front. A right-wing, anti-democratic political alliance of the NSDAP, DNVP, Der Stahlhelm, the Agricultural League and the Pan-German League. It was formed in 1931 to present a unified right-wing opposition to the Weimar government.(Against the government)
Kampfgemeinschaft Revolutionärer Nationalsozialisten (KGRNS) — Combat League of Revolutionary National Socialists, commonly known as the Black Front. An opposition group formed by Otto Strasser in 1930 after he resigned from the Nazi Party to continue what he saw as the Party's original anti-capitalist stance.(Against the government)
Landvolkbewegung — Rural People's Movement. A farmers' movement, mainly in Schleswig-Holstein, formed in the aftermath of January 1928 demonstrations against trade and tax policies.
Nationalbolschewismus — National Bolsheviks. Led by Ernst Niekisch, they combined ultranationalism with social radicalism by claiming to espouse both 'German' principles and much of the program carried out by the Bolsheviks under Lenin.
 Reichsbund der Deserteure — National Association of Deserters. Led by Karl Liebknecht and formed before the breakup from the Independent Socialists.
Reichslandbund — the Agricultural League, or National Rural League, was formed in 1921 through the merger of the two large Protestant right-wing agricultural associations, the Bund der Landwirte (BdL) and the Deutscher Landbund, in order to more effectively assert agricultural interests against the forces of labor and big business. It strove to maintain as much influence as possible for large Junker landowners from east of the Elbe, who were heavily represented among its leadership. Opposed to the Republic, it first was allied with the DNVP and later the Nazi Party. (Against the government)
Spartakusbund — Spartacus League. Originally formed in 1914 by Rosa Luxemburg and Karl Liebknecht, it joined the USPD in 1917. During the November Revolution, it reformed but shortly joined the KPD when it was founded on 1 January 1919. (Against the government)
Völkisch-Sozialer Block (VSB) — Völkisch-Social Bloc. This was a right-wing electoral alliance of völkisch, anti-Semitic and anti-republican groups formed in 1924 during the period that the Nazi Party was outlawed, and was closely aligned with its ideology. It was particularly strong in Bavaria and Thuringia. It disbanded in March 1925, following the reestablishment of the Nazi Party.

Unions
Allgemeiner Deutscher Gewerkschaftsbund (ADGB)
Allgemeiner freier Angestelltenbund (AfA) white-collar employee union affiliated with the SPD-dominated free trade unions. (Pro-Weimar Republic)
Deutscher Landarbeiterverband (German Agricultural Workers' Union) SPD-organized. (Pro-Weimar Republic)
Deutschnationaler Handlungsgehilfenverband (DHV) (National Association of Clerical Employees) — the conservative white-collar worker union.  The DHV leadership did not fully support the NSDAP because it didn't recognize the independence of unions. (Against the government)
Freie Arbeiter-Union Deutschlands (FAUD) — an anarcho-syndicalist trade union that participated in the revolution in Germany and continued to be involved in the German labor movement in the early 1920s.
Gesamtverband Deutscher Beamtengewerkschaften (GDB) was a conservative civil service union.
Gewerkschaftsbund der Angestellten (GdA) was a Hirsch-Duncker union.
Gewerkschaftsbund deutscher Angestelltenverbände (Gedag) was a conservative white-collar union.
Reichsbund Deutscher Angestellten-Berufsverbände was a conservative white-collar union.
Vereinigung der chrislichen-deutschen Bauernvereine (Association of Christian-German Peasant Unions)
Zentralverband der Angestellten (ZdA), an association of white-collar unions started by the SPD. (Pro-Weimar Republic)

Other Organizations
Alldeutscher Verband — Pan-German League. A nationalist and colonialist organization whose goal was to nurture, protect and expand German nationality as a unifying force. (Against the government)
 Deutsches Handwerk. German crafts organization headed by Zeleny.  Zeleny advocated positions that would improve conditions for the old middle class.  It would later back the NSDAP.
 Katholische Burschenvereine.  Catholic youth associations that the Catholic Church started in southern Germany to provide Catholic youth with numerous activities.
Tatkreis movement
Völkisch movement (Against the government)

Secret societies
Bund Wiking — Viking League. A paramilitary organization founded in Munich in 1923 by members of the banned Organisation Consul as a successor group. Its stated aim was the establishment of a military dictatorship and modification of the Treaty of Versailles by armed means, including provocations intended to incite workers into violence and provide the pretext for a coup.
Organisation Consul (OC) — An ultra-nationalist and anti-Semitic terrorist organization that operated from 1920 to 1922. It was formed by Hermann Ehrhardt and several members of his Freikorps brigade. It was responsible for political assassinations, including former Minister of Finance Matthias Erzberger and Foreign Minister Walther Rathenau, that had the goal of destroying the Republic and replacing it with a right-wing dictatorship. The group was banned by the German government in 1922.
Schwarze Reichswehr — Black Reichswehr. Extra-legal paramilitary formations promoted by the German Reichswehr to circumvent manpower restrictions imposed by the Versailles Treaty. Black Reichswehr forces engaged in sabotage acts and assaults during the French occupation of the Ruhr and were responsible for several Feme murders. Active 1919 to 1923.

Reichstag election results
All vote numbers in thousands.
Regional= Total for regional parties not listed individually
Rightist= Total for right-wing parties not listed individually
Splinter= Total for splinter parties not listed individually or among regional or rightist

6/6/1920
   includes by-elections in Schleswig-Holstein and East Prussia (20/2/1921)
   and Upper Silesia (19/11/1922)
 Eligible 35,920	
 Turnout	 28,196	
 % Voting 78.4
 (Party, Votes, Seats)
 KPD	  590	  4
 USPD	 5047	 83
 SPD	 6104	103
 Centre	 3910	 64
 BVP	 1173	 21
 DDP	 2334	 39
 WP	  219	  4
 DVP	 3919	 65
 DNVP	 4249	 71	
 Regional  709	  5	
 Splinter  161	  0
 Total	28415	459

 4/5/1924
 Eligible 38,375	
 Turnout	 29,282
 % Voting 76.3
 (Party, Votes, Seats)
 KPD	 3693	 45
 USPD	  235	  0
 SPD	 6009	100
 Centre	 3914	 65
 BVP	  947	 16
 DDP	 1655	 28
 WP	  530	 10
 DVP	 2728	 45
 DNVP	 5697	 95
 NSFP	 1918	 32
 Regional  608	  5
 Rightist  666	 10
 Splinter  682	  4
 Total	29282	455

 7/12/1924
 Eligible 33,987
 Turnout	 30,290
 % Voting 77.7
 (Party, Votes, Seats)
 KPD	 2709	 45
 USPD	   99	  0
 SPD	 7881	131
 Centre	 4092	 69
 BVP	 1134	 19
 DDP	 1920	 32
 WP	  639	 17
 DVP	 3049	 51
 DNVP	 6206	103
 NSFB 	  907	 14
 Regional  708	  4
 Rightist  545	  8
 Splinter  401	  0
 Total	30290	493

 20/5/1928	
 Eligible 41,224	
 Turnout	 30,754	
 % Voting 74.6	
 (Party, Votes, Seats)
 KPD	 3265	 54
 SPD	 9153	153
 Centre	 3712	 61
 BVP	  946	 17
 DDP	 1479	 25
 WP	 1388	 23
 DVP	 2680	 45
 DNVP	 4382	 73
 NSDAP	  810	 12
 Regional  956	  3
 Rightist 1025	 23
 Splinter  958	  2
 Total	30754	491

 14/9/1930
 Eligible 42,958
 Turnout	 34,971
 % Voting 81.4
 (Party, Votes, Seats)
 KPD	 4592	 77
 SPD	 8578	143
 Centre	 4128	 68
 BVP	 1059	 19
 DDP	 1322	 20
 WP	 1362	 23
 DVP	 1578	 30
 DNVP	 2458	 41
 NSDAP	 6383	107
 Regional  683	  3
 Rightist 2373	 46
 Splinter  455	  0
 Total	34971	577

 31/7/1932	
 Eligible 44,211	
 Turnout	 36,882
 % Voting 83.4	
 (Party, Votes, Seats)
 KPD	 5283	 89	
 SPD	 7960	133
 Centre	 4589	 75
 BVP	 1193	 22
 DDP	  372	  4
 WP	  147	  2
 DVP	  136	  7
 DNVP	 2177	 37
 NSDAP	13769	230
 Regional  219	  0
 Rightist  552	  9
 Splinter  185	  0
 Total	36582	608

 6/11/1932	
 Eligible 44,374	
 Turnout	 35,471	
 % Voting 79.9	
 (Party, Votes, Seats)
 KPD	 5980	100
 SPD	 7248	121
 Centre	 4230	 70
 BVP	 1095	 20
 DDP	  336	  2
 WP	  110	  1
 DVP	  661	 11
 DNVP	 2959	 52
 NSDAP	11737	196
 Regional  353	  1
 Rightist  510	 10
 Splinter  252	  0
 Total	35471	584

 5/3/1933	
 Eligible 44,665	
 Turnout	 39,343	
 % Voting 88.1	
 (Party, Votes, Seats)
 KPD	 4848	 81	
 SPD	 7181	120
 Centre	 4425	 74
 BVP	 1074	 18
 DDP	  334	  5	
 DVP	  432	  2
 DNVP	 3137	 52
 NSDAP	17277	288
 Regional  l246	  0
 Rightist  384	  7
 Splinter    5	  0
 Total	39343	647

List by abbreviation

See also
Weimar paramilitary groups
Weimar Republic
Glossary of the Weimar Republic
Glossary of the Third Reich
Weimar Timeline

References

Sources

Further reading
 Halperin, S. William (1946). Germany Tried Democracy: A Political History of the Reich from 1918 to 1933 online.

Defunct political parties in Germany